Tsukisamu-Chūō Station (月寒中央駅) is a metro station in Toyohira-ku, Sapporo, Hokkaido, Japan. The station number is H13. It is located in the south of the Tōhō Line.

Platforms

Surrounding area
Japan National Route 36 (to Muroran)
Tsukisamu Gymnasium
Tsukisamu Outdoor Stadium
Tsukisamu Community center
Post Office Tsukisamu
Maxvalu Hokkaido supermarket
Hokkaido Bank, Tsukisamu
Tsukisamu Shinkin Bank, Sapporo

External links

 Sapporo Subway Stations

 

Railway stations in Japan opened in 1994
Railway stations in Sapporo
Sapporo Municipal Subway
Toyohira-ku, Sapporo